Tonny Brogaard (born 10 February 1984), formerly Tonny Nielsen, is a Danish football goalkeeper, who last played at Boldklubben Frem in the Danish 1st Division. At 206 cm (6'9"), he is one of the tallest playing footballers.

Career 
Playing as a reserve goalkeeper for Danish amateur club Fremad Amager, he was brought to English club Doncaster Rovers in May 2005. He signed a two-year contract and looked to compete for the starting goalkeeper spot with fellow Dane Jan Budtz.  One of the tallest players in the league, Nielsen was known as "The Gentle Giant" of football.  He did not find much playing time at Doncaster, and only played one game in the pre-season.  He suffered injuries and was soon third goalkeeper choice at the club.  He did appear on the pitch after a match against Manchester City, talking to Jan Budtz after the horrible scenes when Doncaster's first choice keeper Andy Warrington broke his right leg.  Nielsen was eventually released from his contract in October 2006, and moved back to Denmark to play part-time football with Greve IF in the Danish 2nd Division.

External links
 Boldklubben Frem profile

References 

Danish men's footballers
Doncaster Rovers F.C. players
Boldklubben Frem players
1984 births
Living people

Association football goalkeepers
Fremad Amager players
Greve Fodbold players
Avedøre IF players